Arthur Longo (born 21 July 1988) is a French snowboarder. He has competed at the 2014 Winter Olympics in Sochi.

References

External links
 
 
 
 
 

1988 births
Snowboarders at the 2010 Winter Olympics
Snowboarders at the 2014 Winter Olympics
Living people
Olympic snowboarders of France
French male snowboarders
Université Savoie-Mont Blanc alumni
21st-century French people